is a Japanese sailor. He competed in the Finn event at the 1972 Summer Olympics.

References

External links
 

1942 births
Living people
Japanese male sailors (sport)
Olympic sailors of Japan
Sailors at the 1972 Summer Olympics – Finn
Place of birth missing (living people)
Asian Games medalists in sailing
Sailors at the 1970 Asian Games
Medalists at the 1970 Asian Games
Asian Games gold medalists for Japan